Gundekar (1019–1075), (also Gundechar, Gundakar, Gunzo) was bishop of Eichstätt from 1057 to 1075. He is known for his historical work Vitae Pontificum Eystettensium on his predecessors.

He is a Catholic blessed and his feast day is August 2.

References

External links
 Ökumenisches Heiligenlexikon page

 Heiligenlexikon-1858 page

1019 births
1075 deaths
Roman Catholic bishops of Eichstätt
German beatified people